Mykola Popovych (born 3 May 1971) is a Ukrainian cross-country skier. He competed in the men's 10 kilometre classical event at the 1998 Winter Olympics.

References

External links
 

1971 births
Living people
Ukrainian male cross-country skiers
Olympic cross-country skiers of Ukraine
Cross-country skiers at the 1998 Winter Olympics
Sportspeople from Ivano-Frankivsk